Daiki (written: , , , , , , , , , ,  or ) is a masculine Japanese given name. Notable people with the name include:

, Japanese idol, singer and actor
, Japanese footballer
, Japanese baseball player
, Japanese footballer
, Japanese sumo wrestler
, Japanese footballer
, Japanese baseball player
, Japanese footballer
, Japanese footballer
, Japanese artistic gymnast
, Japanese footballer
, Japanese mixed martial artist
, Japanese footballer
, Japanese sumo wrestler
, Japanese footballer
, Japanese professional wrestler
, Japanese ski jumper
, Japanese footballer
, Japanese boxer
, Japanese judoka
, Japanese footballer
, Japanese footballer
, Japanese video game composer
, Japanese footballer
, Japanese footballer
, Japanese footballer
, Japanese footballer
, Japanese politician
, Japanese footballer
, Japanese footballer
, Japanese voice actor
, Japanese footballer
, Japanese judoka
, Japanese footballer
, Japanese footballer
, Japanese footballer
, Japanese footballer
, Japanese racing driver
, Japanese footballer
, Japanese idol, singer and actor
, Japanese footballer
, Japanese footballer
Daiki Suzuki, Japanese-born American fashion designer
, Japanese baseball player
, Japanese footballer
, Japanese footballer
, Japanese basketball player
, Japanese baseball player
, Japanese footballer
, Japanese sumo wrestler
, Japanese footballer
, Japanese footballer
, Japanese footballer
, Japanese footballer
, Japanese footballer
, Japanese voice actor
, Japanese baseball player

See also
9225 Daiki, a main-belt minor planet

Japanese masculine given names